Exochordeae is a tribe of the rose family, Rosaceae, belonging to the subfamily Amygdaloideae.

Genera 
Exochorda Lindl., China and central Asia.
Oemleria Rchb., Pacific Coast, North America.
Prinsepia Royle, Asia

References

External links  

 
Rosales tribes